Yarkovo is a rural locality (a selo) and the administrative center of Yarkovsky District, Tyumen Oblast, Russia. Population:

References

Notes

Sources

Rural localities in Tyumen Oblast
Yarkovsky District